The mijwiz (DIN: miǧwiz) is a traditional Middle East musical instrument popular in Palestine, Lebanon, Jordan and Syria. Its name in Arabic means "dual," because of its consisting of two, short, bamboo pipes with reed tips  put together, making the mijwiz a double-pipe, single-reed woodwind instrument.

Background
The mijwiz consists of two pipes of equal length; each pipe has around five or six small holes for fingering.  It requires a special playing technique known as "circular breathing," which is tricky but produces a continuous tone, without pausing to take a breath.  The mijwiz is played in the Levant as an accompaniment to either belly dancing or dabke, the folkloric line dance of the Levant.  The mijwiz is most popular today in the Levant (Palestine, Lebanon, Syria and Jordan.  Many popular folk songs either include the mijwiz on recordings, or include the instrument's name in the song's lyrics.  One example is the famous Lebanese dabke song "Jeeb el Mijwiz ya Abboud" by the singer Sabah.

The mijwiz is also related to the Arghul (or yarghoul) which consists of one short pipe with five to six holes and a longer pipe joined to it just like the mijwiz and produces a very similar sound to it.

The mijwiz like the argoul is the ancestor of the Scottish bagpipes, however in this case for the mijwiz, the cheeks of the player with their circular breathing act as the bags that contain the air like a human bag pipe.

See also
Mizwad
Arghul
Double flute

References

Single-reed instruments
Arabic musical instruments